The first season of the American television series Gotham, based on characters from DC Comics related to the Batman franchise, revolves around the characters of James "Jim" Gordon and Bruce Wayne. The season is produced by Primrose Hill Productions, DC Entertainment, and Warner Bros. Television, with Bruno Heller and Danny Cannon serving as the showrunners.

The season was ordered in September 2013. Ben McKenzie stars, alongside Donal Logue, David Mazouz, Zabryna Guevara, Sean Pertwee, Robin Lord Taylor, Erin Richards, Camren Bicondova, Cory Michael Smith, Victoria Cartagena, Andrew Stewart-Jones, John Doman and Jada Pinkett Smith. The season was broadcast over 2 runs: the first 10 episodes aired from September to November 2014; and the other 12 episodes aired from January to May 2015. The season premiered on September 22, 2014 and concluded on May 4, 2015 on Fox.

Cast and characters

Main 
 Ben McKenzie as James "Jim" Gordon
 Donal Logue as Harvey Bullock
 David Mazouz as Bruce Wayne
 Zabryna Guevara as Sarah Essen
 Sean Pertwee as Alfred Pennyworth
 Robin Lord Taylor as Oswald Cobblepot / The Penguin
 Erin Richards as Barbara Kean
 Camren Bicondova as Selina "Cat" Kyle
 Cory Michael Smith as Edward Nygma
 Victoria Cartagena as Renee Montoya
 Andrew Stewart-Jones as Crispus Allen
 John Doman as Carmine Falcone
 Jada Pinkett Smith as Fish Mooney

Recurring 
 Drew Powell as Butch Gilzean
 David Zayas as Sal Maroni
 Morena Baccarin as Leslie Thompkins
 J. W. Cortes as Alvarez
 Chelsea Spack as Kristen Kringle
 Alex Corrado as Gabe
 Makenzie Leigh as Liza
 Richard Kind as Aubrey James
 Clare Foley as Ivy Pepper
 Carol Kane as Gertrud Kapelput
 Dashiell Eaves as Kelly
 Philip Hernandez as Guerra
 Danny Mastrogiorgio as Frankie Carbone
 Anthony Carrigan as Victor Zsasz
 Peter Scolari as Gillian B. Loeb

Guest 
 Brette Taylor as Martha Wayne
 Grayson McCouch as Thomas Wayne
 Brad Calcaterra as Minks
 Daniel Stewart Sherman as Mario Pepper
 Polly Lee as Alice Pepper
 Lili Taylor as Patti
 Frank Whaley as Doug
 Dan Bakkedahl as Davis Lamond / The Balloonman
 James Colby as Bill Cranston
 Jack Koenig as Ronald Danzer
 Susan Misner as Marks
 Todd Stashwick as Richard Sionis
 Cole Vallis as Tommy Elliott
 Nicholas D'Agosto as Harvey Dent
 Lesley-Ann Brandt as Larissa Diaz / Copperhead
 Christopher Heyerdahl as Jack Gruber
 Julian Sands as Gerald Crane
 Charlie Tahan as Jonathan Crane
 Cameron Monaghan as Jerome Valeska
 Mark Margolis as Paul Cicero
 Colm Feore as Francis Dulmacher / Dollmaker
 Zachary Spicer as Tom Dougherty
 Milo Ventimiglia as Jason Lennon / Ogre
 Chris Chalk as Lucius Fox

Episodes

Production

Development 
Bruno Heller, a fan of the DC Comics character Bruce Wayne / Batman, had been talking to DC writer Geoff Johns to discuss a potential Batman series. According to Heller, "It opened up a whole world of storytelling that we realized hadn't really been looked at before, which is the world before Batman -- the world of Gotham, young Bruce Wayne, and young James Gordon and the origin stories of the villains". In a September 2014 with Digital Spy, Heller said he was initially hesitant to do a superhero series because he did not know how to write about people with superpowers, adding "Human beings are diminished as soon as a superhero walks onto the screen. As soon as the superhero walks out of frame, you're waiting for them to come back." But when Heller's son suggested that Gordon be the focus of the series, Heller developed the idea of Gordon investigating the murder of Bruce Wayne's parents. That idea, according to Heller, "gave us a starting point and allowed us to tell the saga from a much earlier point than before".

On September 24, 2013, Fox announced that it had bypassed the traditional pilot and placed an order for Gotham to be written by Heller, who was named as showrunner. Danny Cannon also worked as showrunner alongside Heller. Gotham received a series order from Fox on May 5, 2014, with the first season reported to consist of 16 episodes rather than the standard 13 or 22. On October 13, Fox ordered an additional six episodes for the show, bringing the first season order to a full 22 episodes. Fox's Chairman of Entertainment Kevin Reilly stated, "We were only contractually obligated to order 13, and we ordered 16, because we think that's the way that show, at least in its first iteration, will be very strong to arc to. Could we do more next season? We certainly could, but that's where we're starting with that one. That show is going to have a very strong, serialized element". Speaking of the project at the 2014 winter TCA press tour, Reilly described the series as "this operatic soap that has a slightly larger-than-life quality. This is not some adjunct companion series. This is the Batman franchise, just backing it up [in chronology]". He later added that the series is separate from any DC film universe.

Casting 
In January 2014, rumors arose that Donal Logue would portray the series' version of Gordon. Logue denied these rumors, but was eventually cast as Gordon's partner Harvey Bullock. In February 2014, Ben McKenzie was cast as Gordon. McKenzie had previously shot a pilot with Heller for CBS titled The Advocates which was not picked up; this led to Heller writing his characterization of Gordon with McKenzie in mind. McKenzie described this version of Gordon as "a truly honest man. The last honest man in a city full of crooked people" and added, "He's not an anti-hero, he's a true hero – but he will have to compromise."

Casting Bruce Wayne was challenging in part because, as Heller put it "It's such an important casting and it would've been very dangerous to cast the wrong person", adding that the casting process for Wayne "took a lot of negotiation, a lot of back and forth so that everyone was happy and comfortable." In early March 2014, David Mazouz was cast as Bruce while Camren Bicondova was cast as Selina Kyle. Others in the principal cast were Zabryna Guevara as Sarah Essen, Sean Pertwee as Alfred Pennyworth, Robin Lord Taylor as Oswald Cobblepot / Penguin, Erin Richards as Barbara Kean, Cory Michael Smith as Edward Nygma, Victoria Cartagena as Renee Montoya, Andrew Stewart-Jones as Crispus Allen, John Doman as Carmine Falcone, and Jada Pinkett Smith as Fish Mooney, an original creation for the series. Pinkett Smith drew inspiration from various different individuals for playing Mooney: the fictional character Norma Desmond from the 1950 film Sunset Boulevard; and Griselda Blanco, a real-life drug lord of the Medellín Cartel.

Filming 
Production for the season began in New York City in March 2014, and ended a year later on the same month.

Release

Broadcast 
The season was broadcast over two runs on Fox: the first 10 episodes aired from September to November 2014; and the other 12 episodes aired from February to May 2015. The season premiered on September 22, 2014, and concluded on May 4, 2015.

Home media 
The first season was released on Blu-ray on September 8, 2015.

Reception

Ratings

Critical response
The review aggregator Rotten Tomatoes gives the season a rating of 76% based on 91 reviews, with an average rating of 6.85/10. The site's consensus states, "High production values, a talented cast, and an appealingly stylized approach to the Batman mythos help Gotham overcome its occasionally familiar themes." Another review aggregator Metacritic gives the season a score of 71 out of 100, based on 34 critics, indicating "generally favorable reviews".

David Hinckley of New York Daily News praised the first episode for playing "like a 45-minute movie, with stunning visuals that never feel like a shrunken TV version of the Batman films against which it will inevitably be measured" and lauded Logue's Harvey Bullock as a scene-stealer. The San Jose Mercury News Chuck Barney called the pilot "a fun, dark, moody and well-paced first hour" and McKenzie's James Gordon a commanding lead, while saying Jada Pinkett Smith is "an absolute blast to watch." Matt Brennan of Indiewire said that Gotham was "the perfect antidote to superhero fatigue", praising the "bright, pop-inflected aesthetic, with urban backdrops that appear as though cut out from the panels of a comic book."

Jeff Jensen of Entertainment Weekly criticized the first half of season one along with the mid-season premiere. He found the personalities of the most characters "already nearly fully formed; all they can become is more or less than what they already are." Jensen added that Gordon not being Gotham's redeemer hurt the premise of the show and heavily criticized what he saw as the under-use of Jada Pinkett Smith's character. In the end, he does not see Gotham "as a show for comic book fanboys" but rather as "a post-fanboy, or fanboy-irrelevant." Oliver Sava of The A.V. Club lamented that "there have been dozens of interpretations of Batman and his city in the 75 years since their creation, and Gotham has trouble finding the right balance of influences".

References

Gotham (TV series) seasons
2014 American television seasons
2015 American television seasons